Milden is a small village and civil parish in Suffolk, England. Located in the Babergh district, around four and half miles from Sudbury.

The parish contains the Milden Thicks SSSI and the remains of Milden Castle.

Notable residents
William Burkitt, local vicar
Simonds d'Ewes, politician
Herbert Dowbiggin (1880-1966), policeman and eighth British colonial Inspector General of Police of Ceylon from 1913 to 1937.

Location grid

References

External links

Milden Vision of Britain
St Peter's Church Suffolk Churches

Villages in Suffolk
Babergh District
Civil parishes in Suffolk